The Coromandel Range is a volcanic mountain range in the Coromandel Volcanic Zone running the length of the Coromandel Peninsula in the North Island of New Zealand. It is at a right angle to the Tararua ranges. The highest point in the range is Mount Moehau (892 metres/2927 feet), at the northern end of the peninsula within the Moehau Range. There are numerous peaks over 600 metres in height. In pre-European times, the southern Coromandel Range was densely forested by trees such as kauri, mataī and tawa, and was a home for birds such as kererū, tui, kākā and kiwi. Greywacke from the ranges was a source for many stone tools used by Hauraki Māori.

The range is one of several that form a volcanic origin bone running through the northern North Island. To the south of the Coromandel Range, separated by the winding Karangahake Gorge, the bone continues with the Kaimai Range.

The large island of Great Barrier, at the entrance to the Hauraki Gulf due north of the Coromandel Peninsula, can be thought of as a northern continuation of this bone of the Coromandel Volcanic Zone.

See also 
 Messrs. Smyth Brothers' Tramway

References

Mountain ranges of Waikato
Thames-Coromandel District